Guillermo Durán and Horacio Zeballos were the defending champions but chose not to participate.

Marcus Daniell and Artem Sitak won the title, defeating Santiago González and Mate Pavić 6–3, 7–6(7–4) in the final.

Seeds

Draw

References
 Main Draw

San Luis Open Challenger Tour - Doubles
San Luis Potosí Challenger